St Just's Church, St Just in Roseland, is a Grade I listed parish church in the Church of England Diocese of Truro in St Just in Roseland, Cornwall, England, UK.

History

The church is considered to have been founded around 550 AD in honour of St Just the Martyr. For the first 400 years, it was served by the Celtic clergy from the adjacent cell of Lanzeague. Around 950 AD it was taken from the Celtic Church by the Bishops of Cornwall, Crediton and Exeter. In 1140, the church was given by Robert Warelwast, Bishop of Exeter to the Canons of Plympton Priory, and served by their vicars. In 1189 the patronage was recovered from the Priory by John le Sor, Lord of Tolverne, and from that date the incumbents have been Rectors.

The current church building dates from the 13th century. It was consecrated in 1216 by Simon of Apulia, Bishop of Exeter.

It was restored in 1872 and re-opened by the Bishop on Monday 18 November 1872 who arrived at the church on HMS Ganges, the guest of Captain Tinklar. New pews and the pulpit and reredos were provided. A new stone arch opening into the north transept was provided, and the floor was paved with Minton and Hollins encaustic tiles. The altar rails were removed and the altar placed on a level reached by two granite steps. The seating and other woodwork was executed by Messrs Borlase of St Just, and the mason's work was done by Messrs Clemens of Truro.

The vestry was added in the 20th century.

Parish status
The church is in a joint parish with

St Mawes' Church, St Mawes

Organ

The organ was originally in St John the Evangelist's Church, Treslothan. It was moved here in 1966 by Hele & Co and has subsequently been modified by Lance Foy. A specification of the organ can be found on the National Pipe Organ Register.

Virtual Pipe Organ App 
In 2018 the organ was made available as a 'Virtual Pipe Organ' on iPhone and iPad, with 50% of the revenues from the app donated to the parish organ fund.

Rectors of St Just in Roseland

Notable people
The grave of Charles Bowen Cooke (illustrated above right), a notable locomotive engineer, is in the churchyard.

References

St Just
St Just